Miss Russia 2009, Manezh Central Exhibition Hall in Moscow on March 7, 2009. 50 contestants from all over Russia compete for the crown. the reigning Miss World 2008, Ksenia Sukhinova of Tyumen crowned her successor Sofia Rudieva of Saint Petersburg as the brand new Miss Russia. Dayana Mendoza participated in the event.

Results

Placements

Contestants

External links

 Miss Russia Official Website

Miss Russia
2009 beauty pageants
2009 in Russia